Pyotr Alekseyevich Ten (born 12 July 1992) is a Russian professional football player who plays as a right back or left back.

Career
He made his debut in the Russian Premier League on 26 May 2013 for PFC CSKA Moscow in a game against FC Rostov.

In June 2014, Ten joined Anzhi Makhachkala on a season-long loan.

On 16 January 2017, he joined FC Yenisey Krasnoyarsk.

On 17 February 2021, Ten signed for FC Urartu.

Career statistics

Club

Honours
CSKA Moscow
Russian Premier League (1): 2012–13
Russian Cup (1): 2012–13

References

External links
 
 
 

1992 births
Living people
Koryo-saram
Russian people of Korean descent
Footballers from Moscow
Russian footballers
Russia youth international footballers
Russia under-21 international footballers
Association football defenders
PFC CSKA Moscow players
FC Rotor Volgograd players
FC Anzhi Makhachkala players
FC Tom Tomsk players
FC Yenisey Krasnoyarsk players
FC Armavir players
FC Minsk players
FC Urartu players
Russian Premier League players
Russian First League players
Belarusian Premier League players
Armenian Premier League players
Russian expatriate footballers
Expatriate footballers in Belarus
Expatriate footballers in Armenia